Out My Mind, Just In Time Tour was a music concert tour by American R&B/soul singer, Erykah Badu, in support of her album, New Amerykah Part Two (Return of the Ankh). Before the initial kick off of the tour in May, Badu performed concerts in the following cities, on February 19, in Oakland, March 30, Los Angeles and April 8, 2010, in Miami at the Waterfront Theatre.

Opening acts
Bilal (USA—Leg 1-select venues)
Janelle Monáe (USA—Leg 1-select venues)
N.E.R.D. (USA—Leg 1-select venues)
Questlove (USA—select venues)
Lupe Fiasco (USA—Leg 1-select venues)
B.o.B (USA—Leg 1-select venues)

Set list
Badu's set list changed on various dates, however these are songs she performed on the tour:

 "Jump Up In The Air And Stay There" (Video Intro)
 "Amerykahn Promise" (Band Intro)
 "20 Feet Tall
 "Out My Mind, Just In Time"
 "The Healer"
 "Me"
 "No Love"
 "Certainly"
 "Umm Hmm"
 "On & On"/"... & On"
 "Appletree"
 "I Want You"
 "Fall In Love" 
 "You Loving Me" (Extended)
 "Annie Don't Wear No Pannies" 1
 "Soldier" 1
 "Nuclear War"
 "Didn't Cha Know?"
 "Love of My Life (An Ode to Hip-Hop)"
 "Next Lifetime"1
 "Otherside of the Game"
 "Danger"
 "Liberation"/ "That Hump" 1
 "Window Seat"
 "Tyrone" 1
 "Turn Me Away (Get MuNNY)"
 "Penitentiary Philosophy" 1
 "Gone Baby, Don't Be Long"
 "Back in the Day (Puff)" 1
 "Bag Lady" 1
 "My People" (Outro)

(1) performed on select dates in North America and Europe

Band
Director/Keyboards: R.C. Williams
Percussions: Escobedo
Drums: TaRon Lockett
Guitar: Micheal Feingold
Flute: Dwayne Kerr
Bass: Webbe
Turntables: Rashad Smith
Background vocals: Rachel Yahvah, Koryan "Nayrok" Wright, RaRe Valverde

Tour dates

References

External links
 erykah-badu.com

Erykah Badu concert tours
2010 concert tours